The United Nasserite Organization – UNO (Arabic: المنظمة الناصرية المتحدة | Al-Ittihad al-Tanzim al-Nasiri) or Organisation Uni Nassérienne (OUN) in French, also designated variously as 'Unified Nasserite Organization' and 'United Nasirite Organization', was a Lebanese underground guerrilla group  responsible for two high-profile attacks on British military personnel in Cyprus during the late 1980s.

Operations 1986-87
Formed in April 1986 at West Beirut and funded by Libya, this little-known faction of about 50-100 fighters is suspected to be merely a cover for the National Revolutionary Command (Omar al-Mukhtar) or NRC-OM (Arabic: القيادة الثورية الوطنية (عمر المختار) | Al-Qiadat al-Thawriyat al-Wataniyya (Omar al-Makhtar)), an equally obscure Lebanon-based group also backed by Libya that perpetrated several armed actions against western interests in Lebanon and neighbouring Cyprus.  The first action attributed to the UNO took place on 3 August 1986, when a small 'commando' team armed with small-arms, RPG-7s and light mortars attacked a group of British airmen on leave with their families in a beach near the Royal Air Force Akrotiri airbase, Cyprus, wounding two women.  Later in August 1987 another party of UNO fighters ambushed a military vehicle on a Cipriote road, seriously wounding a British soldier and a civilian companion with light machine-gun fire.

Decline and demise
The UNO/NRC has not claimed responsibility for any attacks since 1987, though it is likely that they remained active till the end of the civilian strife in Lebanon.  The group is presumed to have been quietly de-activated due to Libyan pressure in the early 1990s and it is no longer operational.

See also
Al-Mourabitoun
Lebanese Civil War
List of weapons of the Lebanese Civil War
Nasserist Unionists Movement
Popular Nasserist Organization

Notes

Further reading 

 Denise Ammoun, Histoire du Liban contemporain: Tome 2 1943-1990, Fayard, Paris 2005.  (in French) – 
 Edgar O'Ballance, Civil War in Lebanon, 1975-92, Palgrave Macmillan, London 1998. 
 Fawwaz Traboulsi, Identités et solidarités croisées dans les conflits du Liban contemporain; Chapitre 12: L'économie politique des milices: le phénomène mafieux, Thèse de Doctorat d'Histoire – 1993, Université de Paris VIII, 2007. (in French).
 Jean Sarkis, Histoire de la guerre du Liban, Presses Universitaires de France - PUF, Paris 1993.  (in French)
 Rex Brynen, Sanctuary and Survival: the PLO in Lebanon, Boulder: Westview Press, Oxford 1990.  – 
 Robert Fisk, Pity the Nation: Lebanon at War, London: Oxford University Press, (3rd ed. 2001).

External links
The UNO at the Terrorist Organization Profile

Arab nationalism in Lebanon
Arab nationalist militant groups
Socialism in Lebanon
Factions in the Lebanese Civil War
Israeli–Lebanese conflict
Nasserist organizations